Alphinellus minimus is a species of longhorn beetles of the subfamily Lamiinae. It was described by Henry Walter Bates in 1881, and is known from Guatemala.

References

Beetles described in 1881
Endemic fauna of Guatemala
Acanthocinini